Monadnock Regional High School is a public school in Swanzey, New Hampshire. The school serves six towns in the Monadnock region, including Fitzwilliam, Gilsum, Richmond, Roxbury, Swanzey, and Troy. Monadnock was established in 1962 when the district was founded, and named after a nearby landmark, Mount Monadnock.

Middle school 
The middle school is no longer considered separate from the high school. It is in the same building as the high school and shares many facilities.

References

External links
 

Schools in Cheshire County, New Hampshire
Public high schools in New Hampshire
Swanzey, New Hampshire